Pseudeuseboides albovittipennis is a species of beetle in the family Cerambycidae, and the only species in the genus Pseudeuseboides. It was described by Breuning in 1968.

References

Desmiphorini
Beetles described in 1968
Monotypic beetle genera